Dibutyl squarate (also known as squaric acid dibutyl ester or SADBE) is a chemical compound with the molecular formula C12H18O4.  It is the dibutyl derivative of squaric acid.

Medically, it is used for the treatment of warts and for treating alopecia areata or alopecia totalis (autoimmune hair loss) through topical immunotherapy involving the production of an allergic rash. Dibutyl squarate is currently undergoing trials for use in treating herpes labialis (cold sores).

References

Butyl compounds
Diketones